Carex dahurica is a tussock-forming perennial in the family Cyperaceae. It is native to northern parts of Asia.

See also
 List of Carex species

References

dahurica
Plants described in 1910
Taxa named by Georg Kükenthal
Flora of Mongolia
Flora of China
Flora of Russia